The Coronavirus Alleviation Program Business Support Scheme (CAPBuSS) was launched in Ghana on 19 May 2020 by President Nana Akufo-Addo. It was formed as part of Ghana's government intention of providing support to MSMEs who were affected by COVID-19 pandemic. It was presented by an agency under the Ministry of Trade and Industry in Ghana called NBSSI. The president announced GH¢1 billion after it was approved by the parliament of Ghana. The NBSSI ended the disbursement of funds in January 2021.

Categories 
The fund is said to be categorized into two loans with an interest rate of 3% which is payable within 2years.
 Anidaso Soft Loan was meant for firms that are larger than micro-businesses
 Adom Micro Loan was meant for lower micro enterprises.

Job Creation 
According to the Executive Director of NBSSI, more than 21,800 jobs were created under this scheme which were mainly owned by youths in Ghana.

Benefits 
About 110,000 MSMEs in Ghana were said to be owned by women who have benefited from the funds set by the government. In October 2020, government launched an amount to aid banks in Ghana to give financial help to SMEs for their recovery from the shocks of the pandemic. The Executive Director of NBSSI claimed there was an approval for the disbursement of stimulus packages to over 1,000 private schools in the country.

The NBSSI in partnership with the MasterCard Foundation launched the Nkosuo Program for the support of both formal and informal sectors who were affected by COVID-19 pandemic.

References 

COVID-19 pandemic in Ghana
COVID-19 policy of the Nana Akufo-Addo administration
Political responses to the COVID-19 pandemic